Pauly Shore Stands Alone is a 2014 comedy documentary film about Pauly Shore. It was produced by Peter Clune and Joey Vigour, edited by Joey Vigour and Troy Takaki, and directed by Shore himself. It premiered at the 2014 Woodstock Film Festival and was later released on Showtime in December 2014. The film follows actor and comedian Pauly Shore on a cold midwestern tour of small comedy venues in Wisconsin and Minnesota as he interacts with fans and deals with health issues and the realities of mortality.

Synopsis
The documentary opens with a brief clip from Shore's 1993 HBO special Pauly Does Dallas, followed by a title card reading "22 years later." Pauly, now age 45, prepares for his standup comedy tour and speaks about his life and about his ailing mother, Mitzi Shore. Pauly then leaves on his trip for Wisconsin and Minnesota and meets several colorful characters along the way.

It is an unscripted and true-life documentary, notably different in tone and style from Shore's previous films Adopted or Pauly Shore is Dead, which are in the mockumentary style.

Reception
The documentary won Best Documentary at the Downtown Los Angeles Film Festival and the editing by Troy Takaki and Joey Vigour was nominated for an Eddie Award for Best Television Documentary in January 2015.

References

External links
 
 

2014 films
Documentary films about comedy and comedians
American documentary films
2014 documentary films
2010s English-language films
2010s American films